Nike Vision is a sub-company of the Nike corporation which produces prescription eyewear and sunglasses. However products can no longer be purchased directly through the Nike Vision website. Its site now serves as a showcase for Nike sunglasses and eyeglasses.

External links

References 

Eyewear brands of the United States
Vision, Nike
Eyewear companies of the United States